The 1990–91 1. Slovenská národná hokejová liga season was the 22nd season of the 1. Slovenská národná hokejová liga, the second level of ice hockey in Czechoslovakia alongside the 1. Česká národní hokejová liga. 12 teams participated in the league, and ŠKP PS Poprad won the championship and was promoted to the Czechoslovak First Ice Hockey League. Slávia Ekonóm Bratislava was relegated.

Regular season

References

External links
 Season  on avlh.sweb.cz (PDF)

Czech
1st. Slovak National Hockey League seasons
2